West Point is a town in Columbia County, Wisconsin, United States. The population was 1,634 at the 2000 census.

Geography
According to the United States Census Bureau, the town has a total area of 32.5 square miles (84.1 km2), of which, 28.9 square miles (74.9 km2) of it is land and 3.5 square miles (9.2 km2) of it (10.94%) is water.

Demographics
As of the census of 2000, there were 1,634 people, 660 households, and 485 families residing in the town. The population density was 56.5 people per square mile (21.8/km2). There were 907 housing units at an average density of 31.4 per square mile (12.1/km2). The racial makeup of the town was 98.35% White, 0.49% African American, 0.43% Asian, 0.24% from other races, and 0.49% from two or more races. Hispanic or Latino of any race were 0.86% of the population.

There were 660 households, out of which 29.8% had children under the age of 18 living with them, 68.5% were married couples living together, 2.6% had a female householder with no husband present, and 26.4% were non-families. 22.0% of all households were made up of individuals, and 8.8% had someone living alone who was 65 years of age or older. The average household size was 2.48 and the average family size was 2.92.

In the town, the population was spread out, with 24.0% under the age of 18, 3.6% from 18 to 24, 26.4% from 25 to 44, 30.9% from 45 to 64, and 15.1% who were 65 years of age or older. The median age was 42 years. For every 100 females, there were 105.0 males. For every 100 females age 18 and over, there were 105.6 males.

The median income for a household in the town was $55,781, and the median income for a family was $62,132. Males had a median income of $39,063 versus $28,403 for females. The per capita income for the town was $30,750. About 2.5% of families and 3.8% of the population were below the poverty line, including 3.1% of those under age 18 and 5.9% of those age 65 or over.

Protected areas
Gibraltar Rock State Natural Area

Notable people

 Horace N. Polley, Wisconsin State Representative and farmer, lived on a farm in West Point

References

Towns in Columbia County, Wisconsin
Madison, Wisconsin, metropolitan statistical area
Towns in Wisconsin